Mota is a settlement on the right bank of the Mura River in the Municipality of Ljutomer in northeastern Slovenia. The area traditionally belonged to the Styria region and is now included in the Mura Statistical Region.

The local chapel-shrine in the centre of the village was built in 1861 and restored in 1987.

References

External links
Mota on Geopedia

Populated places in the Municipality of Ljutomer